Hepher is a surname. Notable people with the surname include:

 Ali Hepher (born 1974), English rugby union player 
 David Hepher (born 1935), British artist
 John Hepher (1850–1932), Australian politician

Locations
 Biblical locations

See also

 Gath-hepher, town in ancient Israel
 Hepher (biblical figure)
Hefer